Skripino is a rural locality (a village) in Butylitskoye Rural Settlement, Melenkovsky District, Vladimir Oblast, Russia. The population was 178 as of 2010. There are 6 streets.

Geography 
Skripino is located 34 km north of Melenki (the district's administrative centre) by road. Gorokhovo is the nearest rural locality.

References 

Rural localities in Melenkovsky District